19th BSFC Awards
December 13, 1998

Best Film: 
 Out of Sight 
The 19th Boston Society of Film Critics Awards honored the best films of 1998. The awards were given on 13 December 1998.

Winners

Best Film 
1. Out of Sight
2. The General
3. Saving Private Ryan

Best Actor 
1. Brendan Gleeson – The General and I Went Down
2. George Clooney – Out of Sight
3. John Hurt – Love and Death on Long Island

Best Actress 
1. Samantha Morton – Under the Skin
2. Ally Sheedy – High Art
3. Cate Blanchett – Elizabeth
3. Jane Horrocks – Little Voice

Best Supporting Actor (tie) 
1. William H. Macy – Pleasantville, A Civil Action and Psycho
1. Billy Bob Thornton – A Simple Plan
3. Robert De Niro – Great Expectations
3. Stephen Rea – The Butcher Boy

Best Supporting Actress 
1. Joan Allen – Pleasantville
2. Patricia Clarkson – High Art
3. Bridget Fonda – A Simple Plan

Best Director 
1. John Boorman – The General
2. Steven Soderbergh – Out of Sight
3. Roberto Benigni – Life Is Beautiful

Best Screenplay 
1. Scott Frank – Out of Sight
2. Marc Norman and Tom Stoppard – Shakespeare in Love
3. Ed Decter, John J. Strauss, Peter Farrelly and Bobby Farrelly – There's Something About Mary

Best Cinematography 
Janusz Kamiński – Saving Private Ryan

Best Documentary 
1. The Big One
2. Dear Jesse
3. Theme: Murder

Best Foreign-Language Film 
1. Taste of Cherry (Ta'm e guilass) • Iran/France
2. The Celebration (Festen) • Denmark
3. Life Is Beautiful (La vita è bella) • Italy

Best New Filmmaker 
Carine Adler – Under the Skin

External links
Past Winners

References
Boston critics cite ‘Sight,’ ‘General’ Variety
Little-sighted `Out of Sight' wins with Boston critics The Boston Globe
1998 Boston Society of Film Critics Awards Internet Movie Database

1998
1998 film awards
1998 awards in the United States
1998 in Boston
December 1998 events in the United States